Woodland Park can refer to:

Canada
 Woodland Park, Alberta, an unincorporated area
 Woodland Park, Ponoka County, Alberta, a locality in Ponoka County, Alberta
 Woodland Park, Strathcona County, a locality in Strathcona County, Alberta

United Kingdom
 Woodlands Family Theme Park, Devon, an amusement park
 Woodland Park and Pontpren, a Site of Special Scientific Interest in Glamorgan, south Wales

United States
 Woodland Park, Colorado, a city
 Woodland Park School District
 Woodland Park High School
 Woodland Park, Idaho
 Woodland Park, Kentucky
 Woodland Park, Lexington, Kentucky, a neighborhood
 Woodland Park, Michigan
 Woodland Park, New Jersey, a borough
 Woodland Park School District
 Woodland Park, Columbus, Ohio, a neighborhood
 Woodland Park, Portland, Oregon, a neighborhood
 Woodland Park Hospital, a former medical facility
 Woodland Park, Page County, Virginia, an unincorporated community
 Woodland Park, Richmond County, Virginia, an unincorporated community
 Woodland Park (Seattle), Washington, a park
 Woodland Park Zoo
 Woodland Park, West Virginia, an unincorporated community
 Woodland Park District, Saint Paul, Minnesota
 Woodland Park Middle School, San Marcos, California